Somogyzsitfa (until 1950 as Somogyfehéregyháza and Felsőzsitva) is a village in Somogy county, Hungary. It consists of the two former villages of Somogyfehéregyháza and Felsőzsitva.

The settlement is part of the Balatonboglár wine region.

Etymology
Somogyfehéregyháza got its name after its whitewashed buildings or church during the Middle Ages. The name of Felsőzsitva consists of the Hungarian felső and the South Slavic zsitva.

External links 
 Street map (Hungarian)

References 

Populated places in Somogy County